Pál Kelemen (24 April 1894 – 15 February 1993) was a Hungarian-American archaeologist, art historian, and international art lecturer who contributed to the research of Pre-Columbian art. Kelemen was one of the first to recognize the importance of medieval Spanish colonial artwork of the Americas. Kelemen received the Order of Merit from the government of Ecuador.

Early life
Born in Budapest, Kelemen studied art history at the universities of Budapest, Munich and Paris, initially with an emphasis in pre-19th century Impressionism. During World War I he served for four years as a Hungarian cavalry officer. He witnessed the fall of Lemberg. After the war Kelemen started to study early Christian and Byzantine art. In 1932, Kelemen moved to the United States. On May 2, 1932 he married Elisabeth Hutchings Zulauf and seven years later became a naturalized US citizen.

Scholarly contributions
Kelemen carried out several cultural missions and surveys in Latin America, some under the patronage of the Cultural Division of the U.S. Department of State. He also conducted art tours and lectures throughout the United States, Latin America and Europe. Kelemen was a fellow of the Royal Anthropological Institute and the recipient of an honorary degree from the University of Arizona.

Kelemen authored several books about art history, particularly on El Greco, and became the founding member of the Bibliophile Society of Hungary. He also contributed to Encyclopædia Britannica and several other publications. Kelemen supported the authenticity of the Dumbarton Oaks birthing figure. In Medieval American Art (1943) Kelemen called the figure a "unique statue... cut from a rather pale mottled jade [sic]... unbelievably smooth over the entire surface".

Kelemen died at the age of 98 in La Jolla, California.

References

Archaeologists from Budapest
Hungarian art historians
Pre-Columbian scholars
1894 births
1993 deaths
Hungarian people of World War I
People with acquired American citizenship
People from La Jolla, San Diego
Hungarian emigrants to the United States
20th-century archaeologists
20th-century American historians
20th-century American male writers
American art historians
Historians from California
American male non-fiction writers